Prodigal is the self-titled debut album by the Contemporary Christian/Christian rock band Prodigal, released in 1982.

The album cover is notable for mimicking M. C. Escher's Relativity, but featuring imagery inspired by each of the song titles.

In 2014, Loyd Boldman and Rick Fields (founding members of Prodigal and sole owners of all rights to the sound recordings, videos, artwork, images, and music publishing of the complete Prodigal library) released a 3 CD boxed set of all 3 Prodigal albums remastered for digital on Fields' Silver Orb Media label. Shortly after the re-issue was announced, Loyd Boldman died after a long illness.

Track listing

Band members
Loyd Boldman: Keyboards, vocals
Dave Workman: Drums, percussion, vocals
Rick Fields: Guitars, vocals
Mike Wilson: Bass guitar

Other personnel
John Blake: Acoustic Guitar (3)
Jon Goin: Rhythm guitar (5, 7, 10)
Shane Keister: Keyboards (5, 7, 10)
David Kemper: Drums (5, 7, 10)
Farrell Morris: Percussion (5, 7, 10)
David Philbrick: Soprano saxophone (5)
Turley Richards: Background vocals (5, 10)
Jack Williams: Bass guitar (5, 7, 10)

Production
Producer: Jon Phelps
Engineers: Gary Platt, Greg McNeily
Jim Hettinger: Synthesizer programming

References

1982 albums
Prodigal (band) albums